Ramal Internacional de Valença is an international railway line which connects the stations of Valença, in Portugal, and Guillarei, in Galicia (Spain). It was opened on 25 March 1886.

See also 
 List of railway lines in Portugal
 History of rail transport in Portugal

References

Sources

Railway lines in Portugal
Iberian gauge railways
Railway lines opened in 1886